CEB or Ceb may refer to:

Organizations
 CEB (high school), a chain of Mexican high schools
 CEB Inc., commercial firm that provides best practices research, executive education, and decision support tools
 Central Electricity Board, a board set up under The Electricity (Supply) Act 1926
 Ceylon Electricity Board, electricity company in Sri Lanka
 Commodity Exchange Bratislava, a commodity exchange in Slovakia
 Confederation of European Baseball, governing body for baseball and softball in Europe
 Continuing Education of the Bar, a California legal publisher
 Council of Elders of the Bundestag (Germany), a joint deliberative body
 Council of Europe Development Bank, an international lending institution to promote social cohesion

Codes
 CEB, IATA code for Mactan–Cebu International Airport, Philippines
 CEB, ICAO code for Cebu Pacific, Philippines
 Cebuano language (ISO codes)

Other uses
 Čeb, old name for Čelarevo, Serbia
 CAAT enhancer binding, a regulatory sequence in DNA
 Census Enumerators' Books, books used by researchers in social science, local and family history
 Common English Bible,  a new bible translation, began in late 2008
 Compressed earth block, a block manufactured with a mechanical press
 Comunidades Eclesiais de Base, sub-units of parishes
 SSI CEB, a standard form factor for dual processor motherboards
 Sébastien "Ceb" Debs, an esports player